Maryland Route 171 (MD 171) is a state highway in the U.S. state of Maryland. Known as Church Street, the state highway runs  from MD 2 in Brooklyn Park, Anne Arundel County, east to MD 173 in the Curtis Bay neighborhood of Baltimore. MD 171 was constructed in the mid-1920s.

Route description

MD 171 begins at an intersection with MD 2 (Governor Ritchie Highway) in Brooklyn Park, Anne Arundel County. The state highway heads east as a two-lane undivided street through a densely populated residential neighborhood.  After crossing 6th Street, MD 171 enters the city of Baltimore.  After passing through the Curtis Bay neighborhood, the state highway meets its eastern terminus on the edge of the Curtis Bay Industrial Area at MD 173, which is formed by a one-way pair, Pennington Avenue southbound and Curtis Avenue northbound.

History
Church Street was laid out through what was then entirely Anne Arundel County by 1907. It is not clear when the city part of the highway was paved, but the city portion was designated a state highway by 1946.

Junction list

See also

References

External links

 MDRoads: MD 171
 Maryland Roads - MD 171

171
Maryland Route 171
Maryland Route 171